Rocky Road may refer to:

Food
 Rocky road (ice cream), an ice cream flavor that contains marshmallows and nuts
 Rocky road (dessert), a dessert made from chocolate, marshmallows, and nuts
 Rocky Road Cereal, a former American breakfast cereal of the 1980s
Rocky Road, slang for Egg in the Basket
 Rocky Road candy bar, manufactured by the Annabelle Candy Company

Entertainment
 Rocky Road (TV series), an American sitcom that aired from 1985–1987
 The Rocky Road, a 1910 film directed by D. W. Griffith
 Rocky Road Records, a record label
 "Rocky Road" (Once Upon a Time), the third episode from the fourth season of the fairy tale drama Once Upon a Time
 "Rocky Road", a song by Peter, Paul and Mary from their 1963 album In the Wind
 Rocky Road, a 2014 TV movie starring Mark Salling
 The Rocky Road (album), a 2008 album by Damien Dempsey

Literature
 Rocky Road, a 2005 book in the Undercover Brothers series